Omoglymmius cavifrons is a species of beetle in the subfamily Rhysodidae. It was described by Antoine Henri Grouvelle in 1914. It is endemic to Taiwan.

References

cavifrons
Beetles described in 1914
Insects of Taiwan
Endemic fauna of Taiwan